Vera Scantlebury Brown OBE (7 August 1889 – 14 July 1946) was an Australian medical practitioner and pediatrician in Victoria, Australia.

Early life and education
Vera Scantlebury was born in Linton, Victoria, 7 August 1889. Her parents were George James and Catherine Millington (née Baynes) Scantlebury. She was educated at Toorak College before entering medical school at the University of Melbourne. She graduated Bachelor of Medicine (MB) in 1914.

Career
She became resident medical officer at the Melbourne Hospital. "Dr. Vera", as she was commonly known, then moved to the Children's Hospital in 1915, where she was appointed senior medical officer before leaving for England in 1917. In England she was attached to the Endell Street Military Hospital.

She returned to Victoria in 1919 and worked in a variety of honorary positions including: honorary anaesthetist at the Women's Hospital (1920–1922), honorary clinical assistant at the Children's Hospital (1920–1924), honorary physician/surgeon at the Queen Victoria Hospital (1920–1926) and medical inspector at the Church of England Girls' Grammar School (1920–1946). Dr. Vera also was associated with the Victorian Baby Health Centres Association and the Free Kindergarten Union of Victoria.

In 1921, Dr. Vera was appointed part-time medical officer in charge of the city baby health centres and in 1924 she became a doctor of medicine. In 1925, together with Dr. Henrietta Main, she was sent by the Victorian Government to conduct a survey of the welfare of women and children in New Zealand and Victoria. Their report led to the establishment of the Infant Welfare Division in the Department of Public Health.

Dr. Vera married University of Melbourne lecturer (later associate professor) Dr. Edward Byam Brown on 18 September 1926, and they had two children. She was appointed the first Director of Infant Welfare for the Victorian Department of Health in 1926. She remained dedicated to this position until her death. The position was only part-time due to her marriage, a custom of the time when it was considered that married women did not need to work outside the home.

In 1937, following her report on infant welfare for the National Health and Research Council, the Commonwealth Government allocated £100,000 for the benefit of pre-school children, from the Coronation Commemoration Grant. In 1938 the Australian Association of Pre-School Child Development was established, together with the Lady Gowrie Child Centres. The preventive work carried out at these centres in all states was largely the result of Dr. Scantlebury Brown's efforts.

In 1944, pre-school activities including payment of subsidies to free kindergartens were also placed under her supervision, and her vision and enthusiasm achieved a further success in 1945, when the State Government decided to bring under the Health Department the care of expectant mothers and all children to six years of age.

 1914 - 1915 Resident Medical Officer of the Melbourne Hospital
 1915 - 1917 Resident Medical Officer and Senior Medical Officer of the Children's Hospital Melbourne
 1917 - 1919 Attached Royal Army Medical Corps, Endell Street Military Hospital, London, England
 1920 - Resident Medical Officer of the Women's Hospital, Melbourne
 1920 - 1922 Honorary Anaesthetist of the Women's Hospital, Melbourne
 1920 - 1924 Honorary Clinical Assistant, Children's Hospital, Melbourne
 1920 - 1926 Honorary physician and surgeon, Queen Victoria Hospital, Melbourne
 1920 - 1946 Medical Inspector, Church of England Grammar School, Melbourne
 1921 - Part-time medical officer in charge of city baby health centres
 1924 - Awarded degree of doctor of medicine
 1925 - Appointed with Dr. Henrietta Main, by the Victoria Government, to report on the welfare of Victorian women and children
 1926 - 1946 (death) Director of Infant Welfare Victoria at Department of Public Health

Awards and honours
Brown was honoured with her appointment as an Officer of the Order of the British Empire on 9 June 1938 for her work in the fields of infant and maternal welfare.

Selected works
 Brown, Vera Scantlebury, Pre-school child: "model exhibit" of sample toys and occupations for children of different ages up to 5 years of age, H.E. Daw, Government Printer, Melbourne, 1943
 Brown, V. S. & Kate Campbell, A guide to the care of the young child, infant and pre-school ages: for students of infant welfare, Dept. of Health, Division of Maternal, Infant and Pre-School Welfare, Melbourne, 1947, 266 pages

References

External links
University of Melbourne website
 Biography
Friends of Cheltenham and Regional Cemeteries Inc.

1889 births
1946 deaths
Australian paediatricians
Women pediatricians
Deaths from cancer in Victoria (Australia)
Medical doctors from Melbourne
Australian Officers of the Order of the British Empire
Australian women medical doctors
Australian medical doctors
19th-century Australian women
20th-century Australian women